Julius Weismann (26 December 1879 – 22 December 1950) was a German pianist, conductor, and composer.

Biography
Weismann was born in Freiburg im Breisgau. He studied with Josef Rheinberger and Ludwig Thuille. As a composer, he left over 150 opus numbers and numerous works without opus number. His works include six operas, three symphonies, three piano concertos, four violin concertos, eleven string quartets (two of these recently recorded in string orchestra arrangement on a cpo recording), piano music, chamber works (including a violin sonata) and about 200 lieder.

Weismann's six operas were:

 Schwanenweiß (1920, premiered 1923), libretto after August Strindberg
 Ein Traumspiel (1924, premiered 1925), libretto after A. Strindberg
 Leonce und Lena (1924, premiered 1925), after a text by Georg Büchner
 Regina del Lago (1926, premiered 1928), libretto by Erica Stuber after a text by Walter Calé
 Die Gespenstersonate (The Ghost Sonata), libretto after A. Strindberg (1930)
 Die pfiffige Magd (1938, premiered 1939), libretto after Ludvig Holberg

Weismann was also a teacher, whose students included Hans Heinsheimer.

From 1934 Julius Weismann was one of the honorary chairmen of the "Working Group of National Socialist Composers".

He died in Singen am Hohentweil, Lake Constance.

References

Further reading
  A biography of Weismann, part of a series of biographies about people around the composer Bertold Hummel made for the record label Musikproduktion Dabringhaus und Grimm.
 
 Falcke, Wilm: Verzeichnis sämtlicher Werke von Julius Weismann. Verzeichnis des Schrifttums und der Ansprachen über Julius Weismann und seine Werke (Duisburg]: [s.n.], 1955)  (see also )

External links

1879 births
1950 deaths
19th-century German male musicians
20th-century classical composers
20th-century German composers
20th-century German conductors (music)
German male conductors (music)
20th-century German male musicians
German classical pianists
German opera composers
German male classical composers
German male pianists
German Romantic composers
Male classical pianists
Male opera composers